SCGS may stand for:
 St. Clare's Girls' School, Hong Kong
 Singapore Chinese Girls' School, Singapore
 Sugarcane Grassy Shoot Disease
 Sunshine Coast Grammar School, Queensland, Australia
 Surbiton County Grammar School, England
 ICAO code for Siberia Airport (Aeropuerto Siberia), Bío Bío, Chile